GP2 Series, was the support series of the FIA Formula One World Championship. The GP2 Series season consisted of a series of races, divided to Feature (long distance) and Sprint (short races). Each winner was presented with a trophy and the results of each race were combined to determine two annual Championships, one for drivers and one for teams.

Stoffel Vandoorne holds the record for the most Grand Prix victories, having won eleven times. Pastor Maldonado is second with ten wins and Romain Grosjean with Giorgio Pantano are sharing third with nine wins. Luca Filippi holds the distinction of having the longest time between his first win and his last. He won his first GP2 race in 2007 GP2 Series in the Bahrain International Circuit, and his last in 2012 GP2 Series at Monza, a span of five years. Lewis Hamilton, Nelson Piquet Jr., Nico Hülkenberg and Davide Valsecchi sharing the record for the most consecutive wins, having won three races in a row.

The first GP2 race winner was Heikki Kovalainen in the 2005 Imola Feature race, and the most recent driver to score his first GP2 race win was Luca Ghiotto.

By driver

Updated to 27 November 2016

By nationality

Updated to 27 November 2016

By team
Updated to 27 November 2016

Notes

References

race winners
GP2 Series races winners